Mercurius was a Hungarian distinguished nobleman and perhaps the first known voivode of Transylvania, who held the office during the reign of Coloman, King of Hungary. Two royal charters issued in 1111 and 1113 mention Mercurius as "princeps Ultrasilvanus", but he may have been only an important landowner in Transylvania without holding any specific office. The title voivode was first documented specifically in 1199.

A source from 1097 also mentions a "Mercurio comes Bellegratae", which means "count (ispán) of Fehér", and this record may point to the same person.

References

Sources
 Curta, Florin (2006). Southeastern Europe in the Middle Ages, 500-1250. Cambridge University Press. .
 Makkai, László (2001). Transylvania in the medieval Hungarian kingdom (896-1526), In: Béla Köpeczi, HISTORY OF TRANSYLVANIA Volume I. From the Beginnings to 1606, Columbia University Press, New York, 2001, 
  Markó, László: A magyar állam főméltóságai Szent Istvántól napjainkig – Életrajzi Lexikon (The High Officers of the Hungarian State from Saint Stephen to the Present Days – A Biographical Encyclopedia) (2nd edition); Helikon Kiadó Kft., 2006, Budapest; .
  Zsoldos, Attila (2011). Magyarország világi archontológiája, 1000–1301 ("Secular Archontology of Hungary, 1000–1301"). História, MTA Történettudományi Intézete. Budapest. 

Voivodes of Transylvania
Hungarian nobility in Transylvania
Medieval Transylvanian people
11th-century Hungarian people
12th-century Hungarian people

he:מרקוריוס, שליט טרנסילבניה
ro:Mercurius